Estigmene tenuistrigata is a moth of the family Erebidae. It was described by George Hampson in 1900. It is found in Angola, Burundi, the Democratic Republic of the Congo, Kenya, Uganda and Zimbabwe.

References

 

Spilosomina
Lepidoptera of Angola
Lepidoptera of Burundi
Lepidoptera of the Democratic Republic of the Congo
Lepidoptera of Kenya
Lepidoptera of Uganda
Lepidoptera of Zimbabwe
Moths of Sub-Saharan Africa
Moths described in 1900